Sasshūnada Yasutaka (born 7 June 1957 as Katsuyuki Yoshizaki) is a former sumo wrestler from Ibusuki, Kagoshima, Japan. He made his professional debut in January 1976, and reached the top division in September 1986. His highest rank was maegashira 1. He retired in September 1992.  he is an elder in the Japan Sumo Association under the name Tatsutayama.

Career
He was born in the southern city of Ibusuki, in the southernmost prefecture of Kyushu. He is from the same area of Japan as his more famous stablemates, Terao and Sakahoko. He had done judo at high school, but decided to switch to sumo. He joined Kimigahama stable (later Izutsu stable), founded by former sekiwake Tsurugamine in January 1976. He initially fought under his own surname of Yoshizaki. He won the yūshō or tournament championship in his first appearance on the banzuke ranking sheets in the jonokuchi division with a  perfect 7–0 record. However his progress up the ranks was slow. In 1982 he was given the shikona of Sasshunada, meaning "sea of Sasshu." He finally broke into the elite sekitori ranks after the May 1984 tournament when he won the makushita division championship and was promoted to jūryō. (Terao made his juryo debut at the same time). He won the jūryō championship in September 1985 with a mere 10–5 record after beating Hidanohana in a playoff. He won promotion to the top makuuchi division after the July 1986 tournament at the age of 29,  having spent ten years in sumo.

Sasshūnada was one of five men from Izutsu stable in the top division simultaneously, the others being Terao, Sakahoko, Kirishima and Jingaku. However he was unable to make much of an impression on the top ranked wrestlers and lacked the fighting spirit of some his stablemates. He never managed to defeat a yokozuna or win a special prize in his 19 tournaments ranked in the top division, and his highest rank reached was maegashira 1 in March 1988. In September 1989 his three-year stay in makuuchi ended when he scored only 5–10 at maegashira 14, and he was demoted to jūryō where he was to spend the remainder of his career.

Retirement from sumo
Sasshūnada's last tournament was in July 1992, and he chose to retire rather than compete in the makushita division in September. He had not missed a single bout in his career, fighting 1077 consecutive matches. He became an elder of the Sumo Association, working as a coach at Izutsu stable. Unable to purchase elder stock at first, he borrowed a succession of different elder names before acquiring the Tatsutayama name in 1998. In 2005 he transferred from Izutsu stable to work at Michinoku stable, run by his former stablemate Kirishima. He reached the normal retirement age for an elder of 65 in June 2022, but was re-employed for a further five years as a consultant.

Fighting style
Keeping with the reputation of his stable, Sasshūnada was known for having a very powerful pushing attack. His preferred techniques were oshidashi (push out) and hatakikomi (slap down), which together accounted for sixty percent of his career victories.

Personal life
Married with one son, as a wrestler Sasshūnada was fond of visiting pachinko parlours in his spare time.

Career record

See also
Glossary of sumo terms
List of past sumo wrestlers
List of sumo elders
List of sumo tournament second division champions

References

1957 births
Living people
Japanese sumo wrestlers
Sumo people from Kagoshima Prefecture